The 2018 Campeones Cup was the first edition of the Campeones Cup, an annual North American football competition contested between the champions of the previous Major League Soccer season and the winner of the Campeón de Campeones from Liga MX.

The match featured Canadian side Toronto FC, winners of the 2017 MLS Cup, and UANL, winners of the 2018 Campeón de Campeones, for which they qualified by winning the 2017 Liga MX Torneo Apertura. Toronto FC hosted the match at BMO Field in Toronto, Canada on September 19, 2018.

UANL won the match 3–1 to win the inaugural Campeones Cup.

Teams

Venue
As the MLS team, Toronto FC hosted the match, which took place at BMO Field in Toronto, with a seating capacity of 30,000. The stadium opened in 2007 and was renovated in 2016.

Broadcasting

The match's English broadcast was aired in Canada on TSN and the United States on ESPN2. A French broadcast was aired in Canada on TVA Sports 2, while Univision and Univision Deportes Network carried the Spanish broadcast in the United States. The Univision broadcast was watched by an audience of 1.1 million.

Match

Details

Statistics

References

External links

2018
2018 in American soccer
2018 in Canadian soccer
2018–19 in Mexican football
Toronto FC matches
Tigres UANL matches
International sports competitions in Toronto
September 2018 sports events in Canada
2018 in Toronto
International club association football competitions hosted by Canada